Cold Rolled Carbon Steel Sheets and Strip (SPCC) is a Japanese industrial standard for cold rolled steel. Compare: SPHC Hot Rolled Mild Steel Plates, Sheets and Strip.

References

Building materials
Metalworking
Steel industry of Japan